The Blohm & Voss Ha 140 was a German multi-purpose seaplane first flown in 1937. It was intended for use as a torpedo bomber or long-range reconnaissance aircraft but did not enter production.

Design and development
The Ha 140 was developed to meet a requirement for a twin-engine floatplane reconnaissance/torpedo bomber.

The Ha 140 had an all-metal structure of conventional cantilever monoplane layout, with twin floats on pylons beneath its twin wing-mounted engines. The high-mounted wing had a straight centre section and slight dihedral on the outer sections.

The crew consisted of a pilot and radio operator, with a gunner in a revolving turret in the nose or in a second gun position to the rear. The torpedo or bomb load was accommodated in an internal bomb bay.

Three prototypes were built and the design beat the competing Heinkel He 115. However, by then B&V did not have enough spare manufacturing capacity for series production and declined the order, which went to Heinkel instead.

In 1940 the third prototype was modified to test the tail design and variable-incidence wing mechanism used on the BV 144 transport.

Specifications (Ha 140 V2)

See also

References

Notes

Bibliography

 Green, William. Warplanes of the Third Reich. London: Macdonald and Jane's Publishers Ltd., 4th impression 1979, p. 70-71. .
 Schneider, H. Flugzeug-Typenbuch. Herm. Beyer Verlag, Leipzig, 1940

External links

 http://www.flightglobal.com/pdfarchive/view/1938/1938%20-%202762.html Flight, 6 October 1938

Ha 140
1930s German bomber aircraft
Floatplanes
Mid-wing aircraft
Aircraft first flown in 1937
Twin piston-engined tractor aircraft